Hattie Johnson (née Ponti; born September 18, 1981) is a former Olympic athlete. The Athol, Idaho, resident competed in the Women's 10-metre Air Rifle at the 2004 Summer Olympics in Athens, Greece, finishing in 14th place.  In 2003 Pan American Games, she won a bronze medal in the Women's 50-meter Rifle 3 Positions Event.

At the 2004 Summer Olympics, Johnson competed while a member of the United States Army. She was then a medical Spc., assigned to the Marksmanship Unit at Fort Benning, Georgia.

References

External links

 Johnson Places 14th in Olympic Air Rifle Competition

1981 births
American female sport shooters
Living people
Olympic shooters of the United States
ISSF rifle shooters
Shooters at the 2004 Summer Olympics
United States Army soldiers
Women in the United States Army
Pan American Games bronze medalists for the United States
Pan American Games medalists in shooting
Shooters at the 2003 Pan American Games
Medalists at the 2003 Pan American Games
21st-century American women
20th-century American women